"The Other Side" is a song by American singer Jason Derulo, released as the lead single from his third studio album, Tattoos (2013), and its US counterpart Talk Dirty (2014). Derulo co-wrote the song with Martin Johnson and Joshua "Ammo" Coleman; the latter is also the producer. The song was later featured in a TV spot for the 2017 Disney/Pixar film Coco.

"The Other Side" was met with mixed reviews from critics, some praised its energy and catchiness while others defined it as a generic autotuned dance-pop track.

Composition
Courtney E. Smith of Radio.com wrote that "The Other Side" is about what "men really think about before the first time they have sex with a woman they care about."

Music video
The lyric video was uploaded to Jason's YouTube account on April 23, 2013. The official music video was uploaded on May 1 and was directed by Colin Tilley. It features Derulo along with his girlfriend, played by Erika Marosi, in many different locations such as in a bedroom and in a club. It also features Derulo doing a headstand near the end of the video.

Derulo created the acoustic version of this song with Tyler Ward.

Live performances
On August 7, 2013, Derulo performed "The Other Side" on America's Got Talent. He  performed the song at the Capital FM Jingle Bell Ball on December 8, 2013. He also performed the song during iHeartRadio Album Release Party in April 2014. On July 4, 2014, Derulo performed it on Good Morning America as part of its Summer Concert Series.

Track listing

Charts and certifications

Weekly charts

Year-end charts

Certifications

References

2012 songs
2013 singles
Jason Derulo songs
Song recordings produced by Ammo (record producer)
Songs written by Ammo (record producer)
Music videos directed by Colin Tilley
Songs written by Jason Derulo
Songs written by Martin Johnson (musician)